The 48th ceremony of the Annie Awards, honoring excellence in the field of animation for the year of 2020, was held on April 16, 2021, at the University of California, Los Angeles's Royce Hall in Los Angeles, California as a virtual event. The nominations were announced on March 3, 2021.

Productions Categories
On March 3, 2021, the nominations were announced. Soul and Wolfwalkers earned the most nominations with 10, followed by Onward with 7.
{| class="wikitable" style="width=100%"
! style="width=50%" |Best Animated Feature
! style="width=50%" |Best Animated Feature — Independent
|-
| valign="top" |
 Soul — Pixar Animation Studios
 Onward — Pixar Animation Studios
 The Croods: A New Age — Dreamworks Animation
 The Willoughbys — Netflix Presents A Bron Animation Production in association with Creative Wealth Media
 Trolls World Tour — Dreamworks Animation
| valign="top" |
 ''Wolfwalkers — Apple Original Films / GKIDS / Cartoon Saloon A Shaun the Sheep Movie: Farmageddon — StudioCanal and Aardman present in association with Anton Capital Entertainment An Aardman Production for Netflix
 Calamity Jane —  Maybe Movies
 On-Gaku: Our Sound — Rock'n Roll Mountain, Tip Top, GKIDS
 Ride Your Wave — Science SARU / GKIDS
|-
! style="width=50%" |Best Animated Special Production
! style="width=50%" |Best Animated Short Subject
|-
| valign="top" |
 The Snail and the Whale — Magic Light Pictures Baba Yaga — Baobab Studios
 Libresse / Bodyform - #WombStories — Chelsea Pictures
 Nixie & Nimbo — Hornet
 Shooom's Odyssey — Picolo Pictures
| valign="top" |
 Souvenir Souvenir  — Blast Production Filles Bleues, Peur Blanche — Miyu Productions
 KKUM — open the portal
 The Places Where We Live (Cake) — FX Productions and FX
 World of Tomorrow Episode Three: The Absent Destinations of David Prime — Don Hertzfeldt
|-
! style="width=50%" |Best Sponsored Production
! style="width=50%" |Best Animated Television/Broadcast Production for Preschool Children
|-
| valign="top" |
 There's a Monster in my Kitchen — Cartoon Saloon, Mother Erste Group Edgar's Christmas — Unanico Group
 Max & Maxine — Hornet
 The Last Mile — Nexus Studios
 Travel the Vote — Hornet
| valign="top" |
 The Adventures of Paddington — Blue-Zoo Animation Studio and Nickelodeon Animation Studio Buddi  — Unanico Group
 Muppet Babies — Oddbot / Disney Junior
 Stillwater — Apple / Gaumont / Scholastic
 Xavier Riddle and the Secret Museum — 9 Story Media Group, Brown Bag Films
|-
! style="width=50%" |Best Animated Television/Broadcast Production for Children
! style="width=50%" |Best General Audience Animated Television/Broadcast Production
|-
| valign="top" |
 Hilda — Silvergate Media for Netflix Rise of the Teenage Mutant Ninja Turtles — Nickelodeon Animation Studio
 She-Ra and the Princesses of Power — DreamWorks Animation
 Star Wars: The Clone Wars — Lucasfilm Animation
 Victor and Valentino — Cartoon Network Studios
| valign="top" |
 Genndy Tartakovsky's Primal — Cartoon Network Studios Close Enough — Cartoon Network Studios
 Harley Quinn  — Eshugadee Productions in association with Warner Bros. Animation
 Rick and Morty  — Rick and Morty LLC
 The Midnight Gospel  — Titmouse Animation for Netflix
|-
! colspan="2" style="width=50%" |Best Student Film
|-
| colspan="2" valign="top" |
 La Bestia — Marlijn Van Nuenen, Ram Tamez, Alfredo Gerard Kuttikatt 100,000 Acres of Pine  — Jennifer Alice Wright
 Coffin — Yuanqing Cai, Nathan Crabot, Houzhi Huang, Mikolaj Janiw, Mandimby Lebon, Théo Tran Ngoc
 Latitude du printemps — Sylvain Cuvillier, Chloé Bourdic, Théophile Coursimault, Noémie Halberstam, Maŷlis Mosny, Zijing Ye
 O Black Hole! — Renee Zhan, Jesse Romain
|}

Individual achievement categories

Additional Individual Awards

June Foray AwardDaisuke "Dice" TsutsumiSpecial Achievement in AnimationHoward'' — Don Hahn, director

Ub Iwerks Award
Epic Games for Unreal Engine

Winsor McCay Lifetime Achievement Awards
Willie Ito
Sue Nichols (posthumously)
Bruce Smith

Multiple awards and nominations

Films

The following films received multiple nominations:

The following films received multiple awards:

Television/Broadcast
The following shows received multiple nominations:

The following shows received multiple awards:

References

External links
 Complete list of 48th Annual Annie Awards nominees

2020
Annie
Annie
Annie
Annie
April 2021 events in the United States
Events postponed due to the COVID-19 pandemic
Impact of the COVID-19 pandemic on cinema
Impact of the COVID-19 pandemic on television